Carandbike.com is an Indian news portal that covers the news of automobile industry, founded in 2015. It is currently owned by Mahindra Group after its acquisition from NDTV. The platform is also known as NDTV Auto. It also acts as a marketplace for new and used cars, and publishes reviews from automotive sector.

Siddharth Vinayak Patankar is the current editor-in-chief of the platform.

History 
Carandbike.com started in 2015 and was operated by Fifth Gear Ventures. It was part of media house NDTV before its acquisition by Mahindra & Mahindra through its unit Mahindra First Choice Wheels Limited.

In 2016, NDTV Limited had held 39.57 percent of the company, while 39.58 percent was held by NDTV Convergence Ltd.

In January 2016, Carandbike.com tie up with Mahindra Group for the launch of KUV100. In January 2018, Tata Motors partnered with Carandbike.com for the online bookings of its Tata Tiago.

Carandbike Awards 
The company has established Carandbike Awards to recognize the best in the automobile industry.

See also 
 Mahindra Group
 NDTV

References

External links 

Indian journalism organisations
Indian news websites
Automotive websites
NDTV Group